Odontestra is a genus of moths of the family Noctuidae.

Species
 Odontestra albivitta Hampson, 1905
 Odontestra altidudinis Laporte, 1973
 Odontestra atuntseana Draudt, 1950
 Odontestra avitta Fawcett, 1917
 Odontestra balachowskyi Laporte, 1974
 Odontestra conformis Hampson, 1918
 Odontestra ferox Berio, 1973
 Odontestra goniosema Hampson, 1913
 Odontestra malgassica Viette, 1969
 Odontestra potanini (Alphéraky, 1895)
 Odontestra pseudosubgothica Berio, 1964
 Odontestra richinii Berio, 1940
 Odontestra roseomarginata Draudt, 1950
 Odontestra simillima (Moore, 181)
 Odontestra submarginalis (Walker, 1869)
 Odontestra unguiculata Berio, 1964
 Odontestra variegata Berio, 1940
 Odontestra vitta Berio, 1974
 Odontestra vittigera (Hampson, 1902)

References
Natural History Museum Lepidoptera genus database
Odontestra at funet

Hadeninae